John Strohmeyer (June 26, 1924 – March 3, 2010) won the 1972 Pulitzer Prize for Editorial Writing “for his editorial campaign to reduce racial tensions in Bethlehem.”

Strohmeyer was born in Boston, Massachusetts. After working as a night reporter for the now-defunct Bethlehem Globe-Times of Bethlehem, Pennsylvania while attending Moravian College, he spent three years in the United States Navy during World War II, ultimately attaining the rank of lieutenant. A graduate of Muhlenberg College (1947) and the Columbia University Graduate School of Journalism (1948), Strohmeyer was a Nieman Fellow at Harvard University during the 1952–1953 academic year while employed by The Providence Journal. In 1956, he returned to Bethlehem, where he served as editor of the Globe-Times until 1984. He won an Alicia Patterson Journalism Fellowship in 1984 to research and write about the decline of the American steel industry, a project that evolved into Crisis in Bethlehem: Big Steel's Struggle to Survive (Adler & Adler, 1986; University of Pittsburgh Press, 1994).

In 1992, Robert Atwood recruited Strohmeyer to teach journalism at the University of Alaska Anchorage in a position endowed by Atwood. While there, Strohmeyer wrote Extreme Conditions: Big Oil and the Transformation of Alaska. Strohmeyer also wrote Atwood's biography, which was never published due to a dispute which arose after Atwood's death between Strohmeyer and Atwood's daughter Elaine.

John Strohmeyer died of heart failure on March 3, 2010, in Crystal River, Florida.

References

Pulitzer Prize for Editorial Writing winners
1924 births
2010 deaths
American male journalists
Journalism teachers
Writers from Boston
Writers from Bethlehem, Pennsylvania
Writers from Anchorage, Alaska
Journalists from Pennsylvania
People from Crystal River, Florida
20th-century American journalists